"The Dickensian Aspect" is the sixth episode of the fifth season of the HBO series The Wire. The episode was written by Ed Burns (from a story by David Simon and Ed Burns) and was directed by Seith Mann. It aired on February 10, 2008.

Plot

As Marlo's crew searches in vain, an injured Omar hides himself in the same building where he was ambushed by Michael, O-Dog, Partlow, and Snoop. He threatens Fat Face Rick and takes his gun, which he uses to wound a Stanfield soldier before setting fire to one of Marlo's cash pickups. Marlo increases the bounty on Omar's head, suspends the meetings of the New Day Co-Op, and ups the wholesale drug price for its members. A wary Slim Charles declines Marlo's offer for control of the Baltimore County territories, which are instead given to Cheese. At the Baltimore Sun, Templeton's reporting on the "serial killer" gets national attention, leading editors Whiting and Klebanow to ask for a follow-up article. Templeton spends the night under the Jones Falls Expressway and interviews Terry, a homeless Iraq War veteran with PTSD. Gus is pleasantly surprised with the high quality of Templeton's piece, but remains skeptical of his reporting overall. He asks Templeton to pursue a report from Fletcher of a complaint on Templeton's story about a woman who died from seafood poisoning. When Templeton claims the complaint was false, Gus takes his word at face value, but remains suspicious.

McNulty realizes that Templeton made up a few details of his own about the killer. Bunk, thoroughly disgusted with McNulty's behavior, dives back into the old murder cases tied to Marlo's crew. He decides to interview Randy Wagstaff, who remains in his group home, but he refuses to cooperate. Greggs tells Bunk that an informant implicated Marlo's crew for her triple homicide. They learn that evidence from the vacant murders has become irrevocably jumbled due to human error. Bunk then investigates the killing of Bug's father and interviews Michael's mother. While there, she implies Chris and Snoop were the killers, leaving Bunk surprised. He is given a folder of stolen grand jury indictments found in Proposition Joe's shop. Meanwhile, Mayor Carcetti hosts a ribbon-cutting ceremony for portside condos while being heckled by ex-dockworkers, including Nick Sobotka. Later, Carcetti gives a press conference vowing to protect the homeless from the "serial killer." Wilson and Steinhorf suggest that running on defending the homeless may be Carcetti's key to getting elected governor. Daniels hands the stolen indictments to Pearlman and Bond, who realize there is a leak in the courthouse.  Bond also makes clear that he will be handling the Clay Davis trial alone (with the implication being that he wants to ensure that the spotlight shines solely on himself), and that he wants to remove some witnesses from the trial list.

Judge Daniel Phelan declines McNulty and Pearlman's request for a wiretap on the Sun's phones. Freamon reveals his illegal wiretap of Marlo to Sydnor, who agrees to help. He determines that Marlo is sending photos, but a new wiretap authorization is needed to see what is being sent. McNulty finds that, with police now arriving on the scene immediately whenever a homeless person turns up dead, he is unable to stage more serial murders. He comes across a mentally ill homeless man named Larry and, with Freamon's help, photographs him with the "killer"'s trademark ribbon, after which Larry will never be seen again; the killer, according to the cover story, will now only send photos of his victims to the press, and their bodies will not be found. McNulty gives Larry $100 and drives him down to a homeless shelter in Richmond, Virginia, giving him a stolen ID card. As he leaves, he feels a pang of guilt over what he has done to Larry.

Production

Guest stars

Peter Gerety as Judge Daniel Phelan
Pablo Schreiber as Nick Sobotka
Maestro Harrell as Randy Wagstaff
Felicia Pearson as Felicia "Snoop" Pearson
Anwan Glover as Slim Charles
Method Man as Melvin "Cheese" Wagstaff
Delaney Williams as Jay Landsman
William Joseph Brookes as Lawrence Butler
Shamika Cotton as Raylene Lee
Brian Anthony Wilson as Vernon Holley
Michael Willis as Andy Krawczyk
David Costabile as Thomas Klebanow
Sam Freed as James Whiting
Nancy Grace as Herself
Dion Graham as Rupert Bond
Sho "Swordsman" Brown as Phil Boy
Christopher J. Clanton as Savino Bratton
Kwame Patterson as Monk Metcalf
Troj Marquis Strickland as Ricardo "Fat-Face Rick" Hendrix
Robert Poletick as Steven Luxenberg
Scott Shane as Scott Shane
Brandon Young as Mike Fletcher
William F. Zorzi as Bill Zorzi
Luray Cooper as Nat Coxson
Aubrey Deeker as Terry Hanning (credited as Aubrey Daniels)
Roscoe Orman as Oscar Requer
Richard Pelzman as Little Big Roy
Dionne Audain as Social Worker
Dave Ettlin as Dave Ettlin
Crissandra Spencer as Crissandra Spencer
Ken Ulman as Reporter Ken Ullman
Russ Widdall as Ron Lowenthal
Neerja Sharma as Woman Monk interviews
Edet B. Isuk as Stanfield soldier (shot by Omar)
Jeffrey Wendell Moffatt as Stanfield muscle 
Rashiela Daniels as Unknown
Reginald Gilmer as Unknown
Carlos J. Gonzalez as Unknown

Uncredited appearances
Mike D. Anderson as Ghost
Megan Anderson as Jen Carcetti
Donald Neal as Jay Spry
Ed Norris as Ed Norris

In popular culture
Emcee Noesis from Philadelphia Slick references the episode in his song "Meet the Press".

References

External links
"The Dickensian Aspect" at HBO.com

The Wire (season 5) episodes
2008 American television episodes